The Vanderbilt University Owen Graduate School of Management is the graduate business school of Vanderbilt University in Nashville, Tennessee, United States. Founded in 1969, Owen awards six degrees: a standard 2-year Master of Business Administration (MBA), an Executive MBA, a Master of Finance, a Master of Accountancy, a Master of Accountancy-Valuation, and a Master of Management in Health Care, as well as a large variety of joint professional and MBA degree programs.  Owen also offers non-degree programs for undergraduates and executives.

The student to faculty ratio is about 9 to 1, with 577 students and 49 full-time faculty members. The school's 8,304 living MBA alumni are found throughout the U.S. and around the world.

The school is named for Ralph “Peck” Owen and his wife, Lulu Hampton Owen. Ralph Owen, a Vanderbilt alumnus (’28), was a founder of Equitable Securities Corporation in Nashville, and he became the chairman of the American Express Company.

History
Vanderbilt University Owen Graduate School of Management has been in operation since 1969, but the university's first proposal for a business education program came from its Board of Trust (BOT) in 1881. They called it the Commercial College Department. No program was established then, however, and it was the mid-1950s before a program of business administration was offered in the Department of Economics. With the economic growth in Nashville and Middle Tennessee at that time, local businessmen, many of whom were Vanderbilt alumni and BOT members, recognized the need for a formal business education program to train leaders for the area. They were concerned that too many aspiring young businessmen would attend schools in other parts of the country and then remain in those regions.

Progress was slow in seeing the need fulfilled; the idea was conceived during the administration of Chancellor Harvie Branscomb (1946–63) but did not come to fruition until the administration of Chancellor G. Alexander Heard (1963–82). The BOT passed the school's founding resolution on May 5, 1967, and operations as the Graduate School of Management began in September 1969 with twelve faculty members and six students. Classes met in a renovated funeral home, a gift from Mr. and Mrs. David K. Wilson; he was one of those concerned Nashville businessmen, a Vanderbilt alum (’41), and a Vanderbilt BOT member. The building was named Alexander Hall in honor of Henry Clay Alexander, a Vanderbilt alum (’23), a Vanderbilt BOT member, and president of J.P. Morgan.

The first dean, Igor Ansoff, held master's degrees in engineering and in mathematics and physics from the Stevens Institute of Technology; his PhD from Brown University was in applied mathematics. He had most recently been a professor of industrial administration at Carnegie-Mellon but previously worked at Lockheed, where his specialty was strategies of diversification. He had also written and published works on business education and business management.

It was under the leadership of Dean Samuel B. Richmond, a statistician from Columbia University, who had been acting dean of Columbia Graduate School, that the school was named for Ralph and Lulu Owen (1977). In 1930, two years after graduating from Vanderbilt University, Ralph Owen became a founding member of Equitable Securities Corporation in Nashville. By 1950, the firm was recognized as the second largest investment banking firm in the United States. Equitable purchased controlling interest in American Express in 1949 and 1950, and Owen became American Express chairman (1960–68). Following the deaths of both Mr. and Mrs. Owen, their estates gave $33.5 million to The Owen School, said to be the largest gift to a U.S. business school at that time. That sum raised the total of their gifts to more than $62 million.

The Owen School outgrew Alexander Hall, and its new home was completed in 1982. Management Hall is connected to a historic building, Mechanical Engineering Hall, which encloses a central courtyard and serves as home to the Executive MBA program. Mechanical, built in 1888, was the first building in Tennessee designed for the teaching of engineering.

In July 2013, M. Eric Johnson started his tenure as the Ralph Owen Dean and Bruce D. Henderson Professor of Strategy. Johnson previously served as Associate Dean for the MBA program at Dartmouth College's Tuck School of Business, where he was also Faculty Director of the Glassmeyer/McNamee Center for Digital Strategies and Benjamin Ames Kimball Professor of the Sciences of Administration. He began his academic career at Vanderbilt's Owen Graduate School of Management, where he taught from 1991 to 1999. One of the youngest professors to receive tenure in the school's history, Johnson twice won the Dean's Teaching Excellence Award while at Owen.

From the beginning of the planning for what became The Owen School, the goal was to create a graduate business school of “the highest professional quality” with a two-year program leading to an MBA. Most students in the early years were young men from Tennessee and surrounding states, fulfilling the hopes of businessmen to keep talented people in the area, but by 2008, men and women from across the United States and from international locales had attended The Owen School. At present about 25 percent are international students, and 33 percent are women. Recruiters from American and international companies have sought out the students, and the school has expanded its offerings to specialized master's degrees (in health care, finance, and accountancy), an Executive MBA program, and an Executive Development program.

Programs
The Owen Graduate School of Management is accredited by the AACSB International (The Association to Advance Collegiate Schools of Business) and is a full member of the Executive MBA Council (EMBAC).

The Owen Graduate School's programs are organized by students' career stage level and interest.  The classifications are: Young Professional Programs, Early Career Programs, Executive Programs, and Health Care Programs.

Career launcher programs
These programs are designed for undergraduates and recent college graduates who want to attain a certain skill set at the start of their careers.

MS Finance

MAcc 
The Owen Graduate School of Management offers Masters of Accountancy with specialization in two fields- Assurance and Valuation

Master of Marketing 
The new Vanderbilt Master of Marketing degree program is scheduled to begin classes in July 2016. The 10-month program aims to put graduates on a fast career path in companies of all sizes—from new start-ups to large established firms—and in a variety of industries, such as consumer packaged goods, technology and health care.

Accelerator Summer Business Institute

The Accelerator—Vanderbilt Summer Business Institute is designed for undergraduates and recent graduates in all majors. In the four-week program students in teams take classes and serve as consultants for actual businesses needing solutions to an actual challenge. Recently, students have worked with companies such as American Airlines, BlueCross BlueShield, Bridgestone, Coca-Cola, FedEx, Humana, Lexus, Sony Music Entertainment, Yum! Brands, and more.

MBA programs
Early-career programs are designed for professionals who want to alter their career path in its first stages. These include both the MBA and Health Care MBA.

MBA
The Owen School's MBA degree program takes two years to complete and requires a minimum of 62 credit hours. The program is set up in eight modules (equal to four semesters) of full-time study. Students must take core courses in the fundamentals of management and complete them within their first year. MBA students may choose from the following career paths: finance, real estate, marketing, health care, human and organizational performance, operations, consulting, general management, entrepreneurship, or a custom career path. Then students must take courses in one concentration, one course in international business, and courses outside their primary concentration. In addition to earning an acceptable letter grade, students must complete a project before graduation. The approach to learning (ranked in order of percentage) includes lecture, case study, team project, simulations, and experiential learning. The Leadership Development Program begins at orientation when students join teams, and executive coaches work with students on an individual basis to explore their leadership abilities. Throughout the four modules, this program challenges students with exercises, projects, and workshops.

Health Care MBA

Executive programs
Executive programs are designed for working professionals.  Programs include the Executive MBA, the Americas MBA for Executives, the Master of Management in Health Care, and various non-degree executive development programs.

Executive MBA (EMBA)
Most students who pursue the Executive MBA have been working in the business world for some time. Many are corporate executives who want to advance within their companies. Others are entrepreneurs who want to advance their businesses, and still others are professionals who want to become managers rather than practitioners. The program requires 24 months. In 2009, incoming students began following an alternating Saturday schedule and two summer sessions. The change from an alternating Friday/Saturday schedule was made to accommodate students in a challenging economic environment. The first EMBA class graduated in the spring of 1980.

Americas MBA for Executives (AMBA)
The Americas MBA, an offshoot of the EMBA, is designed for working professionals who need more training for senior-level responsibilities for global organizations.  The second year of the program consists of four 10-day residencies in the following countries: Brazil, Canada, Mexico, and the United States.  Upon completion of the program, students earn both the Vanderbilt MBA and the Americas MBA Alliance Certificate, issued by all partner schools from all participatory countries.

Executive Development Institute
The Owen School offers several programs for working professionals: Open Enrollment Programs require a two- or three-day commitment. The topics offered include management fundamentals, leadership, health care, and banking. Custom Corporate Programs are designed for specific organizations that seek solutions to a business challenge.  In partnership with BAI (Bank Administration Institute), the Vanderbilt Banking Institute offers two-day programs for leaders in financial services management.  Beginning in the fall of 2009, business executives were able to earn certificates in some subjects, notably health care and banking, by taking six to twelve two-day courses instead of three-day courses.

Health care programs
The two available health care programs are designed for business professionals.

Health Care MBA
The Health Care MBA got under way in 2005, and Owen students were committed to a curriculum “requiring more health care-specific courses than any other program of its kind in the nation.”  In addition to taking courses, students earning the Health Care MBA gain direct experience at the Vanderbilt University Medical Center and local health care companies. For example, they may attend operations, go on rounds with social workers, or visit community clinics.

Health Care MBA students are required to take 28 credit hours in business fundamentals. Also they select a concentration, requiring 12 credit hours, which may be in finance, accounting, general management, human and organizational performance, information technology, marketing, operations, or strategy. Some companies that have recruited Owen Health Care MBAs include Abbott Laboratories, Boston Scientific, HCA, and Johnson and Johnson.

Master of Management in Health Care
Students complete requirements for the Master of Management in Health Care within one year by taking core business courses one night per week and health care courses one weekend per month. They also work in teams on a project. Most students are clinicians, physicians, or nurse managers; all candidates must have at least five years of work experience in their fields. Students have learned that by following standard business practices, providers can improve the quality of care to patients and save money.

Walker Management Library
Students have access to the Walker Library collection of more than 50,000 volumes, more than 900 periodical titles, reference works, and electronic databases such as Factiva, Bloomberg, Lexis/Nexis, Vault, and Thomson Reuters Datastream|Datastream Advance. The library also offers assistance to faculty and staff, alumni, and corporate clients. Located in Management Hall, the library was named in honor of Anne Marie and Thomas B. Walker, Jr.

Rankings
Owen's two-year MBA program is consistently ranked among the top business schools in the nation by major publications. In 2016, Owen was ranked #22 in U.S. News & World Report rankings. Bloomberg Businessweek ranked the full-time MBA program #30 in 2014.

The Owen Graduate School of Management has received many accolades for both its MBA and Executive MBA programs.

Disciplines
The Owen School's faculty members have presented papers at conferences around the world, have published reference books, and have published papers in leading journals such as the Academy of Management Journal, Journal of Finance, MIT Sloan Management Review, and the Journal of Applied Psychology. Eight percent of faculty members have owned a business.

Finance
Students seeking the MBA in finance may choose a finance concentration, a corporate finance specialization, or an investment management specialization. The latter two require more credit hours (20). Companies that have hired Owen students in finance careers include Amazon.com, Black and Decker, Goldman Sachs and UBS. Finance was the most popular area for Vanderbilt MBA students in 2007–8; 43 percent accepted jobs in that field.

Marketing
The Master of Marketing degree requires the completion of 32 credit hours. Twelve credit hours are required for a marketing concentration; twenty credit hours are required for brand management specialization. Some companies that have hired Owen students for marketing careers include Delta, FedEx, IBM, UPS and Microsoft. Dawn Iacobucci, E. Bronson Ingram Professor in Marketing, has written works on mediation analysis, marketing management, and marketing research. Bruce Cooil, Dean Samuel B. and Evelyn R. Richmond Professor of Management, was awarded the 2007 Marketing Science Institute/H. Paul Root Award for research challenging the fundamentals of the loyalty metric Net Promoter.

Health care

Human and organizational performance (HOP)
Twelve credit hours are needed for a HOP concentration with two required HOP courses. Companies that have hired Owen students for HOP careers include General Mills, Nissan, and Pfizer. A study by Professor Timothy M. Gardner titled "In the Trenches at the Talent Wars: Competitive Interaction for Scarce Human Resources" highlights how trained professionals can help firms retain their human capital.

Operations
The operations concentration requires 12 credit hours with one required course. Companies that have hired Owen students for careers in operations include Apple, Emerson, Harrah's Entertainment, and HP. Michael A. Lapré, E. Bronson Ingram Professor in Operations Management, is known for his work on organizational learning curves; he has received the Shingo Research Prize, among other awards. Professor Nancy Hyer's book Reorganizing the Factory: Competing through Cellular Manufacturing, written with Urban Wemmerlov of the University of Wisconsin–Madison, won the 2003 Shingo Prize for Research in Manufacturing, awarded “in recognition of outstanding contribution to the body of knowledge in the field of manufacturing excellence.”

Entrepreneurship
To pursue an entrepreneurship emphasis, students need to fulfill 8 credit hours; they choose four courses compatible with their interests. Students in Professor Germain Boër's classes can expect a mix of creative assignments and speakers who are entrepreneurs. First-year MBA entrepreneur students who are accepted in the Summer Enterprise Development Internships receive a stipend so that they can start their own ventures.

Real estate
To have a real estate emphasis, students must take three required courses and choose other classes from The Owen School and the Engineering School at Vanderbilt. Companies that have hired Owen students for real estate careers include CBRE, Gaylord Entertainment, and PricewaterhouseCoopers. Jacob Sagi, Associate Professor of Management, has interests in asset pricing and decision theory.

Consulting
A primary concentration in finance, operations, marketing, or HOP is typical for students who pursue a consulting career; they have to fulfill 12 credit hours. A secondary concentration is often in strategy, which requires 12 credit hours. Each of the finance, the marketing, and the HOP concentrations requires two specific courses and the rest electives. Operations requires one course, and the rest electives. Companies that have hired Owen students for careers in consulting include The Boston Consulting Group, Deloitte Consulting, ECG Management Consultants, and North Highland. Professor David C. Parsley served in the research department of the Federal Reserve Bank, San Francisco, before joining The Owen School; international finance is one of his interests. Luke Froeb, William C. and Margaret W. Oehmig Associate Professor in Entrepreneurship and Free Enterprise, is the former director of the Bureau of Economics for the Federal Trade Commission; he is dedicated to tearing down barriers to competition in the business world, and his models have been applied in the area of merger analysis.

Student life

Most Owen students live off campus, but on campus they have a wide variety of opportunities to meet other students. Owen-related groups sponsor everything from Thursday night socials to community service activities to the Capitalist Ball (a black-tie event). A sense of community is important to faculty, staff, and students. The Student Recreation Center offers facilities for basketball, squash, racquetball, and indoor swimming; there are tennis courts and an outdoor track.

The Vanderbilt University campus, designated as a national arboretum, is near downtown Nashville.

Technology
Owen was an early adopter wireless technology on campus. Classrooms, study areas, the outdoor courtyard, and adjacent businesses have access to Owen's high-speed wireless network. In 2008, storage was added for more e-mail and file storage. Printers are available in various locations for students’ use.

Community service
The Owen School was one of two winners of the 2008 TeamMBA Award, which was presented by the Graduate Management Admission Council (GMAC).

Centers of excellence

Financial Markets Research Center (FMRC)
Directed by Professor Hans Stoll, the FMRC was founded in 1987 to research financial markets and institutions. It hosts an annual conference bringing researchers, government regulators, and leaders of industry to the campus. Conferences in the last few years dealt with the topics of financial markets and financial policy (speakers in the spring of 2009 included Paul Volcker, Stephen Axilrod, and William Dudley), conflicts of interest in financial markets, and innovation in finance. Co-director of the FMRC is Robert E. Whaley, featured above.

Turner Family Center for Social Ventures 
The Cal Turner Family Foundation committed nearly $1.2 million over five years to establish the Turner Family Center for Social Ventures at Vanderbilt Owen Graduate School of Management. Mario Avila, MBA'12, became the director of the center in July 2015.

Owen Entrepreneurship Center
The Nashville Capital Network's director is Germain Böer, Professor of Management.

Cal Turner Program for Moral Leadership in the Professions
As its name indicates, this program promotes and discusses moral leadership among professionals. It is named for the late CEO of Dollar General Cal Turner. Bart Victor is the executive director.

Vanderbilt Center for Environmental Management Studies
The Vanderbilt Center for Environmental Management Studies is a university-wide joint initiative led by the School of Engineering, the Owen Graduate School of Management, and the Law School.  VCEMS activities focus on environmental business, management, and technologies.

Center for Healthcare Markets Innovation
The Center for Healthcare Markets Innovation was launched in 2016.

Alumni

Academia
 Marjorie K. Eastman, MBA'12 – author of The Frontline Generation
  | title = About Author
  | publisher = Skylight Paths Publishing
  | url = http://www.skylightpaths.com/page/category/thomas_huynh
  | access-date = 2013-05-18}}</ref>
 Eric L. Harry, MBA'83 – American author best known for his novels Arc Light and Invasion
 C. Turney Stevens, Jr., MBA'81 – Dean of the College of Business at Lipscomb University
 Craig Fleisher, MBA – scholar and author in the fields ofpublic affairs, competitive intelligence and analysis
 Millicent Lownes-Jackson, MBA – founder, The World Institute for Sustainable Education and Research (The WISER Group)

Business
 Anu Aiyengar, MBA'99 – Head of Mergers and Acquisitions at JPMorgan Chase & Co
 Jim Beavers, MBA '96 – Director of Marketing for Capitol Records
 David Farr, MBA'81 – Chairman and CEO of Emerson Electric
 Adena Friedman, MBA'93 – President and CEO of NASDAQ
 Mahni Ghorashi, MBA '12 – co-founder of Clear Labs
 David Bronson Ingram, MBA'89 – Chairman and CEO of Ingram Entertainment
 John R. Ingram, MBA'86 – Chairman of Ingram Content Group and Ingram Industries
 Prashant Khemka, MBA'98 – CIO of Global Emerging Markets equity at Goldman Sachs, founder of White Oak Capital Management
 Doug Parker, MBA'86 – Chairman and CEO of American Airlines Group
 Betty Thayer, MBA'82 – CEO of Exec-appointments.com
 James C. Tsai, MBA'98 – President,  New York Eye and Ear Infirmary of Mount Sinai
 Philip C. Wolf, MBA '80 – founder and CEO of PhoCusWright

Government
 Megan Barry, MBA'93 – Mayor of Nashville
 Jim Bryson, MBA'85 – member of the Tennessee State Senate
 John Cooper, MBA '85 – Mayor of Nashville; former Global Head of Technology Investment Banking at Lehman Brothers
 Steven Reed, MBA'04 – first African-American Mayor of Montgomery, Alabama
 Tom Tait, MBA'85 – Mayor of Anaheim, California
 Bruce Heyman, MBA'80 – 30th United States Ambassador to Canada, former Vice President of Goldman Sachs 
 Francis Guess, MBM'74 – member of the Tennessee Commission on Civil Rights
 Jonathan Jordan MBA '92 – member of the North Carolina House of Representatives
 Paul C. Ney Jr., JD, MBA'84 – General Counsel of the Department of Defense of the United States, appointed by President Trump 
 Ihor Petrashko, MBA '01 – Minister of Economic Development and Trade of Ukraine

See also
 List of United States business school rankings
 List of business schools in the United States

References

Vanderbilt University
Business schools in Tennessee
Educational institutions established in 1969
1969 establishments in Tennessee